Alta Wind Energy Center (AWEC), also known as Mojave Wind Farm, is the third largest onshore wind energy project in the world. The Alta Wind Energy Center is a wind farm located in Tehachapi Pass of the Tehachapi Mountains, in Kern County, California. The project, being developed near Tehachapi Pass Wind Farm— site of the first large-scale wind farms installed in the U.S. in the 1970s and 1980s—is "a powerful illustration of the growing size and scope of modern wind projects".

Southern California Edison has agreed to a 25-year power purchase agreement for the power produced as part of the power purchase agreements for up to 1500 MW or more of power generated from new projects to be built in the Tehachapi area. The project will "reduce carbon dioxide emissions by more than 5.2 million metric tons, which is equivalent to taking 446,000 cars off the road". A total of 3000 MW is planned.

The wind farm was developed by Terra-Gen Power which closed a US$1.2 billion financing deal in July 2010 with partners that included Citibank, Barclays Capital, and Credit Suisse. After many delays, the first phase began construction in 2010. Financing for additional phases of $650 million was secured in April 2012. Construction of the Alta Wind Energy Center is expected to create more than 3,000 domestic manufacturing, construction, and maintenance jobs, and contribute more than one billion dollars to the local economy.

History

The original "Alta-Oak Creek Mojave Project" plan consisted of up to 320 wind turbines occupying a  area while producing 800 MW of power. That project was originally developed by Oak Creek Energy Systems under the contract with Terra-Gen, but the project development was later transferred to Terra-Gen. The project then became the first development under the umbrella of Alta Wind Energy Center.

The Alta-Oak Creek Mojave Project is generally located at the south side of the Oak Creek Road, starting a few miles west of the state route 14 in Mojave and continuing westward along the Oak Creek Road to the west side of the Tehachapi-Willow Springs Road.

According to the American Wind Energy Association, two initial projects were completed in fall 2010, the 150 MW Alta II (Vestas) project using 50 3 MW generators and the 150 MW Alta I project using 100 1.5 MW generators. Three subsequent projects 150 MW Alta III, 102 MW Alta IV, and 168 MW Alta V projects were completed in the 2nd quarter of 2011 using 50, 34, and 56 3 MW Vestas V-90 wind turbines. Alta VIII and Alta VI projects, comprising 300 MW, were completed in late 2011/early 2012, but they were renamed Brookfield Tehachapi 2 and Mustang Hills respectively. Alta VII and IX projects comprising 300 MW, were completed in December 2012 (bringing the total to 1320 MW), but they were renamed to Pinyon Pines Wind I and Pinyon Pines Wind II.

138 MW Alta X and 90 MW Alta XI are under development with scheduled completion in late 2013, 180 MW Alta XIII in 2019.

Overview

Electricity production

See also

Tehachapi Wind Resource Area
Wind power in California
Wind power in the United States
Ivanpah Solar Power Facility

References

External links
Cleanenergyactionproject.com: Alta Wind Energy Center

Wind farms in California
Buildings and structures in Kern County, California
Tehachapi Mountains
Energy infrastructure completed in 2010
2010 establishments in California
Southern California Edison